This is a list of Romanian football transfers for the 2018–19 summer transfer window. Due to size concerns, only moves featuring 2018–19 Liga I are listed.

Liga I

Astra Giurgiu

In:

Out:

Botoșani

In:

Out:

CFR Cluj

In:

Out:

Concordia Chiajna

In:

Out:

CS U Craiova

In:

Out:

Dinamo București

In:

Out:

Dunărea Călărași

In:

Out:

FCSB

In:

Out:

Gaz Metan Mediaș

In:

Out:

Hermannstadt

In:

Out:

Politehnica Iași

In:

Out:

Sepsi Sfântu Gheorghe

In:

Out:

Viitorul Constanța

In:

Out:

Voluntari

In:

Out:

Transfers
Romania
2018